Ramarathnam Narasimhan (born 1960) is an Indian materials engineer and a professor at the Department of Mechanical Engineering of the Indian Institute of Science. He is known for his pioneering researches on fracture mechanics and is an elected fellow of the Indian Academy of Sciences, Indian National Science Academy and the Indian National Academy of Engineering. The Council of Scientific and Industrial Research, the apex agency of the Government of India for scientific research, awarded him the Shanti Swarup Bhatnagar Prize for Science and Technology, one of the highest Indian science awards for his contributions to Engineering Sciences in 1999.

Biography 

R. Narasimhan, born on 31 May 1960 in the south Indian state of Tamil Nadu, gained a graduate degree in engineering from the Indian Institute of Technology, Madras in 1982 and moved to the US to join the California Institute of Technology from where he secured a master's degree in mechanical engineering in 1983 and followed it up with a PhD in Applied Mechanics in 1986. His post-doctoral studies were also at Caltech at the laboratory of Ares J. Rosakis, simultaneously working as a faculty at the institute. On his return to India, he joined the Indian Institute of Technology, Bombay in 1987 where he stayed for four years before joining the Indian Institute of Science in 1991 and serves IISc as a professor at the department of mechanical engineering. During this period, he had three sabbaticals; once in Sweden at the Royal Institute of Technology and twice in Singapore at the Institute for High Performance Computing, Singapore and at National University of Singapore.

Legacy 

Narasimhan's researches have been focused on the theoretical, computational and applied aspects of Solid Mechanics, Fracture Mechanics and Mechanics of Materials. During his post-doctoral days at Caltech, he worked with Rosakis on elastic-plastic solids with regard to crack initiation and growth and their studies on three-dimensional effects on elastic-plastic crack tip fields demonstrated the dominance of the effect at a distance of half the specimen thickness from the crack front. He has also worked on the deformation and fracture behaviour of bulk metallic glasses and is credited with the development of a method for quantifying the micro-mechanics of mixed mode ductile fracture involving microvoid coalescence and shear band. Collaborating with Upadrasta Ramamurty, his colleague at IISc, he worked on fracture mechanics of bulk metallic glasses and these studies enabled them to identify the time scale of fracture as well as to propose an explanation for the nano-trenches. He has documented his researches in several articles; ResearchGate and Google Scholar, online repositories of scientific articles, have listed 103 and 141 of them respectively.

Narasimhan is a former member of the Science and Engineering Research Board of the Department of Science and Technology. He sits in the editorial boards of journals including Engineering Fracture Mechanics and Journal of Mechanics and Physics of Solids of Elsevier, and the International Journal of Fracture of Springer. Besides, he is a former member of the editorial board of Current Science journal of the Indian Academy of Sciences. He has mentored a number of master's and doctoral scholars in their studies and has delivered several keynote or invited speeches including at the Complex Geometry and Operator Theory conference jointly organized by the Indian Statistical Institute and Institute of Mathematical Sciences in December 2015.

Awards and honors 
His work alongside Ares Rosakis at Caltech earned Narasimhan the Rudolph Kingslake Medal of the SPIE, an honor he shared with Rosakis and Alan Taylor Zehnder in 1988. The Council of Scientific and Industrial Research awarded him the Shanti Swarup Bhatnagar Prize, one of the highest Indian science awards in 1999. The Indian Academy of Sciences elected him as a fellow in 2000 and he became an elected fellow of the Indian National Science Academy in 2002. A year later, the Indian Institute of Science awarded him the 2003 Prof. Rustom Choksi Award for Excellence in Research and he received the Distinguished Alumnus Award of the Indian Institute of Technology, Madras in 2016. Narasimhan, who has been holding the J. C. Bose National Fellowship of the Department of Science and Technology of India since 2010, is also an elected fellow of the Indian National Academy of Engineering.

Selected bibliography

See also 
 Ductility
 Solid mechanics
 Bhagavatula Dattaguru

Notes

References

External links 
 

Recipients of the Shanti Swarup Bhatnagar Award in Engineering Science
1960 births
Indian scientific authors
Indian materials scientists
Indian mechanical engineers
Engineers from Tamil Nadu
Tamil scientists
IIT Madras alumni
California Institute of Technology alumni
California Institute of Technology faculty
Academic staff of IIT Bombay
Academic staff of the Indian Institute of Science
Living people
Fellows of the Indian National Academy of Engineering
20th-century Indian engineers